Lei cha (pronounced )  or ground tea is a traditional Southern Chinese tea-based beverage or gruel that forms a part of Hakka cuisine.
In English, the dish is sometimes called thunder tea since "thunder" is homonymous with "pounded".

History
The custom of lei cha began in the Three Kingdoms period or even Han Dynasty. It is very common among Hakka people in Hakka regions of Taiwan. It is brought by Hakka people to Taiwan, Indonesia,  Malaysia, and any locales with a substantial Hakka diaspora population. Besides Hakka lei cha, lei cha is also traditional among Hunanese people in northern Hunan. 

Lei cha is not the same as Taiwanese tea because there are always other ingredients. Ground tea consists of a mix of tea leaves and herbs that are ground together with various roasted nuts, seeds, grains, and flavorings.

Production
Although lei cha can be bought commercially prepared and prepackaged, the drink is usually made "from scratch" just as it is about to be consumed.

Popular areas
Hunan, Jiangxi, Guangdong, Guangxi, Fujian and Taiwan.

Ingredients and preparation

Ground tea is a varying mix of:
Tea leaves – any type of tea leaf can be used, but the most popular and common are either green tea or oolong; for ease of use, sometimes matcha (finely milled green tea) is used
Roasted nuts, legumes and seeds – the most commonly used are peanuts, mung beans, and sesame; other examples include soybeans, pine nuts, pumpkin seeds, sunflower seeds, lentils, and lotus seeds
Roasted grains – examples: cooked or puffed rice, wheat
Herbs and flavorings – examples: ginger, salt
Chinese herbal medicine may be included for health purposes

The ingredients are ground in a food processor, or with a mortar and pestle, or in a large earthenware basin with a wooden stick. The mix should be reduced to a powder that resembles fine cornmeal.

The powder is then placed into a serving bowl and hot water is stirred into it to produce a thin soup-like beverage.

Consumption

The tea is drunk for breakfast or on cold winters as a tasty and healthy restorative.

Lei cha may also be taken as a dietary brew. In that case, it is served with rice and other vegetarian side dishes such as greens, tofu, and pickled radish. A variety of lei cha popular as khai lang lei cha is sold as street food in Malaysia.

Traditionally, lei cha is a savory brew; however, in contemporary interpretations it is often consumed as a sweet drink.

See also
 Hakka cuisine
 Taiwanese cuisine
 Hunan cuisine
 Chazuke

References

External links
History and cultural significance of lei cha

Hakka
Hakka cuisine
Blended tea
Taiwanese tea
Tea culture
Hakka culture in Taiwan
Hakka culture in Singapore